Frunzensky District may refer to:

Frunzensky District, Russia, name of several districts and city districts in Russia
Nemyshlyanskyi District, formerly Frunzensky District, a city district of Kharkiv, Ukraine
Frunzenski District, a city district of Minsk, Belarus

See also
Frunzensky (disambiguation)
Frunze (disambiguation)

District name disambiguation pages